Scopula tersicallis is a moth of the  family Geometridae. It is found on the Marquesas Archipelago.

References

Moths described in 1929
tersicallis
Moths of Oceania